Nick Ferguson (born November 27, 1974 in Miami, Florida, United States) is a former American football safety in the National Football League. He spent the majority of his career with the Denver Broncos.

He was originally signed by the Cincinnati Bengals as an undrafted free agent in 1996. He played college football at Georgia Tech. Ferguson has also been a member of the Saskatchewan Roughriders, Rhein Fire, Winnipeg Blue Bombers, Chicago Bears, Buffalo Bills, and New York Jets in his career.

Professional career

Denver Broncos
Playing with the Denver Broncos, Ferguson started 44 games at safety, grabbing six interceptions along the way. His most notable play came in the 2006 AFC Divisional Playoffs when he came on a safety blitz and pressured Tom Brady into throwing a 100 yard interception by Champ Bailey.

Houston Texans
On March 27, 2008, he signed a one-year contract with the Houston Texans. On March 12, 2009, he re-signed a new one-year contract with the Texans.

Post Retirement
Ferguson served as an assistant coach with the San Francisco 49ers in 2018, following coaching internships with the 49ers, Broncos, Seattle Seahawks and Texans.

In addition to coaching, Ferguson has spent time as a sports-talk radio host with the NFL on TuneIn, NBC Sports Radio, WQXI, KFWB and Voice of America. He has also written for The Players' Tribune.

Ferguson hosted a sports-talk radio show on Sports Radio 104.3 The Fan in Denver.

Notes and references

https://www.pro-football-reference.com/players/F/FergNi20.htm

External links
Denver Broncos bio
Houston Texans bio
New York Jets bio

1974 births
Living people
Players of American football from Miami
Players of Canadian football from Miami
American football safeties
Morris Brown Wolverines football players
Georgia Tech Yellow Jackets football players
Cincinnati Bengals players
Saskatchewan Roughriders players
Rhein Fire players
Winnipeg Blue Bombers players
Chicago Bears players
Buffalo Bills players
New York Jets players
Denver Broncos players
Houston Texans players